E For Edward is the eighth album by West London Post punk and Indie band The Times released in 1989.<ref name="Discogs.com">[http://www.discogs.com/Times-E-For-Edward/release/953228 The Times on Discogs.com]</ref>

Track listing
 Vinil version (Creation Records - CRELP 053)

Side AManchesterValvalineSnowCatherine WheelCrashed On YouSide BCount To FiveAll Your LifeFrench Film BleurredNo Love On Haight StreetAcid Angel Of Ecstasy CD version (Creation Records - CRECD 053)Manchester - 04:22Valvaline - 04:54Snow - 04:27Catherine Wheel - 03:06Crashed On You - 04:57Count To Five - 05:35All Your Life - 04:41French Film Bleurred - 05:47No Love On Haight Street - 03:05Acid Angel Of Ecstasy - 03:58Gold - 04:08Sold - 04:33Life'' - 04:40

Personnel
Edward Ball (vocals, guitar, acoustic guitar)
Paul Heeren (guitar)

References

The Times (band) albums
1989 albums